The Exposition universelle, internationale et coloniale was a world's fair including a colonial exhibition held at Parc de la Tête d'or in Lyon, France in 1894. The exposition drew unwanted attention with the assassination of French President Sadi Carnot during his visit on 24 July 1894; he died the day after. The exposition drew 3.8 million visitors.

History 
The exposition was originally planned as a national exposition to be held in 1892, but the short interval since the Paris 1889 Universal Exposition led to a postponement of two years and a call for international participation.

Several names were given to the project: "l’Exposition internationale et coloniale de Lyon, en 1894", "Exposition nationale de Lyon en 1894" and "l’Exposition universelle de 1894" before the eventual name "Exposition internationale et coloniale". At the same time San Francisco and Antwerp organised world's fairs as well.

3.8 million people visited the exposition, and the success of the exposition led to renaming the neighbourhood next to the exposition from Tête d'Or to Tonkin de villeurbanne, thus referring to North Vietnam (Tonkin), at that time part of French Indochina, in order to satisfy the inhabitants attracted to the exotic colonial atmosphere.

Organization 
The main building of the exposition was a 55-metre high metal dome with a diameter of 242 metres. Several themes got dedicated pavilions:
 Education (palais de l’enseignement)
 City of Paris
 City of Lyon and the surroundings (département du Rhône)
 Faith (palais des arts religieux)
 Economy (palais de l'économie sociale)
 Art
 Agriculture
 Labour
 Railways
 Civil engineering
 Forestry services

French colonies were represented as well in four pavilions:
 Algeria (palais de l’Algérie)
 Tunisia (palais de la Tunisie)
 French Indochina (palais de l’Indochine)
 French West Africa (palais de l’Afrique occidentale).

See also
 Hanoi exhibition another colonial exhibition, 8 years later, in French Indochina

References

World's fairs in Lyon
French Third Republic
1894 establishments in France
19th century in Lyon
Festivals established in 1894
Colonial exhibitions